The PwC Cool Night Classic is a 5 km run or 3 km walk held in Brisbane annually for charity.

In its 18th year, the event is organised by PwC and has run every year since 1994. It is a charitable event which to date has raised over AUD$570,000 for charities including Redkite and the Prince Charles Hospital Foundation.

Course
The course begins at River stage at the edge of Brisbane city, traverses over the Goodwill Bridge, through Southbank, over the Victoria Bridge and along a length of the motorway finishing at the QUT side of the Botanical gardens.

2012
In 2012, over 5100 runners participated, with over AUD$90,000 raised, making it one of the largest annual fun runs held in Brisbane each year.

References

5K runs
Charity events in Australia